The Triple-V Foodmasters is a former Philippine Basketball League (PBL) team which lasted two years in the premier amateur league from 1991-1992.

Championships
Triple-V won their first PBL title in only their second participated tournament in the import-flavored Challenge Cup, the Foodmasters defeated defending champion Crispa 400, 3 games to 1. 

They repeated as back-to-back champions in the following year as they overcame a tough challenge by Sta. Lucia Realtors in winning the Philippine Cup title in a five-game series. They lost to the same Realtors in the championship via sweep in the following conference.

In the last offering of the 1992 PBL season called Invitational Cup, Triple-V drafted three players from the disbanded Crispa White Cement squad, they are Johnny Abarrientos, Felix Duhig and Freddie Abuda, and they took in Michael Mustre from A & W Hamburgers, which also sought a leave of absence from the league.  Triple-V won their third title in the last four conferences and scored a similar 3-0 sweep and exact revenge over championship rival Sta.Lucia Realtors.

Roster list
Johnny Abarrientos
Dennis Abbatuan
Freddie Abuda
Arthur Ayson
Patrick Belardo
Ronnie Cahanding
Edison Cubacub
Rafael Dinglasan
Jolly Escobar
Tonyboy Espinosa
Noynoy Falcasantos
Dwight Lago
Noli Locsin
Gil Lumberio
Mike Mustre
Victor Pablo
Arnold Polonio
Django Rivera
Allen Sasan
Eddie Viaplana
Vernie Villarias
Vic Villarias

See also
 1991-92 Philippine Basketball League season

References

Former Philippine Basketball League teams